Glucose 1,6-bisphosphate is a derivative of glucose 1-phosphate.  In the glycogenesis metabolic pathway, glucose 1,6-bisphosphate is an intermediate in the conversion of glucose 6-phosphate into glucose 1-phosphate by the enzyme glucose-1,6-bisphosphate synthase.

References

Monosaccharide derivatives
Organophosphates